Rutilio Torres Mantecón, also known as Rui Torres (30 December 1976 – 20 February 2008)  was an artist known for being the presenter for the first and second seasons (between 2000 and 2003) of the Latin American version of the TV show Art Attack (or Arte manía in some countries) of the TV channel Disney Channel.

Later, he was replaced by Spanish presenter Jordi Cruz (2003), whose voice was dubbed for Latin-American markets.

He died on February 24, 2008. There has been rumours regarding his cause of death, including suicide and antidepressant overdose, but none of them confirmed.

In 2021, the former Spanish presenter of Art Attack, Jordi Cruz, also confirmed his passing in an interview.

Notes 

1976 births
2008 suicides
Mexican television presenters
Drug-related suicides in Mexico
People from Mexico City